Clio’s Psyche: Understanding the “Why” of Culture, Current Events, History, and Society:  is an academic journal established in 1994 by the Psychohistory Forum (1982–) to further interdisciplinary knowledge of society and history utilizing the tools of applied psychoanalysis, political psychology, psychobiography, psychohistory, and related disciplines. It is part of the innovative field of psychohistory and it was created by the members of the Forum to both keep a record of the scholarship the psychohistory forum was nurturing. Initially, it started as a newsletter and before long became a full length, double-blind refereed journal, one of several in the field. Its website is at cliospsyche.org. and issues a year or more old may be found there along with a listing of all interviews, issues, and memorials.

Clio's Psyche has become one of the leading journals in the field of psychological history. There have been numerous special issues and features, symposia and a few festschrifts honoring psychohistorians Robert Jay Lifton, Peter Loewenberg, and Vamik Volkan. Authors come from academic institutions such as the following universities and colleges: Brandeis, Brown, Harvard, Helsinki, Princeton, Rutgers, UConn, Texas, Wesleyan, Williams, Yale, UCLA, and a large variety of clinical settings. A major activity has been to interview over sixty contributors to psychohistorical knowledge. Publication is both in print and online. It also publishes detailed biographical memorials of deceased colleagues. The background of the authors it publishes incline to be as follows: academics from many disciplines, clinicians from many different backgrounds, and laypeople interested in pursuing the life of the min. Submissions deemed suitable by the editors are refereed by scholars in a double blind system.

See also
 Cliodynamics
 Cliodynamics (journal)

References

External links
Journal Home Page

Psychology journals
Academic journals published by learned and professional societies of the United States